The Korg Pa600MY is a musical arranger keyboard based on the Korg Pa600 which, in turn, belongs to the  series of internationally acclaimed and bestselling musical arrangers. It has added unique Malaysian ethnic instruments and musical styles alongside the classic keyboard sounds of piano, brass and synthesizer. The keyboard was developed as a joint collaboration between Korg and Malaysian distributor CK Music. It was created with the aim to "preserve and promote Malaysia’s unique blend and harmony of our three ethnic races".

Ethnic instruments of Malaysia's three main races (Malay, Chinese and Indian) are sampled in the studio with ethnic musicians and their respective instruments. Launched in Malaysia on 29 April 2016, the keyboard was well received and covered by the Malaysian press.

Core Features 

Powered by Enhanced RX (Real eXperience) and DNC (Defined Nuance Control) sound engine, the Korg Pa600MY offers superb and realistic sounds. Navigation uses a large, colored TouchView™ display. Two assignable switches and a 4-way joystick are included for control of sound articulation. The Korg Pa600MY has a pair of 15W Double Cone Speakers in a Bass Reflex Box.

List of Ethnic musical instruments 

The Korg Pa600MY has more than 950 sounds, including 31 ethnic instruments such as

Malay 
 Angklung
 Cak Lengpong
 Seruling
 Kompang
 Rebana
 Malay Gong
 Marwas
 Serunai
 Gendang

Chinese 
 Guzheng
 Pipa
 Sanxian
 Liuqin
 Ruan
 Erhu
 Yangqin
 Dizi
 Jing Bo
 Xiao Luo/ Jing Luo
 Ban Gu

Indian 
 Veena
 Nadhaswaram
 Mridangam
 Dholak
 Thavil

References

Korg synthesizers